SC 08 Bamberg is a German association football club from the city of Bamberg, Bavaria.

The club experienced a stellar rise in the late 1980s and early 1990s, climbing from the tier six Bezirksliga to the third division Fußball-Bayernliga. It also made two appearances in the German Cup in this era, in 1991 and 1992. After two seasons in the third division however, the club declined and fell as quickly as it had risen, to the point where it now plays at the tenth level of the German football league system.

History
The club was established on 6 May 1908. Under the Third Reich sports organizations in Germany were reorganized for political reasons and in 1933 SC Bamberg was united with Sportfreunden Bamberg to play as Sportvereinigung 08 Bamberg. Following World War II, SC reemerged as a separate side on 23 March 1948. The team spent four seasons in the 2nd Amateurliga Bayern (IV) from 1954 to 1958.

1. SC's rise began in 1988, when it was promoted to the Bezirksliga Oberfranken-West (VI), followed in 1989, when a second place in this league behind champions DJK/Viktoria Coburg, earned it promotion to the Bezirksoberliga Oberfranken. The club followed this up with a title in this league the season after and 1. SC's progress continued in the Landesliga Bayern-Nord (IV) in 1990–91, where the team won the league championship and earned promotion to the Bayernliga for the first time.

SC took part in the early rounds of DFB-Pokal (German Cup) play in 1991–92 and 1992–93. The club advanced all the way to the round of the last 16 in 1991–92, when it was able to defeat 1. FC Saarbrücken and TSV Havelse before losing 1–0 to 1. FC Kaiserslautern. In 1992–93, the club's cup run was not quite as impressive, being knocked out 3–1 by Eintracht Frankfurt in the second round.

In the Bayernliga (III), 1. SC was not able to follow up the success of previous seasons. The club came 14th in its first year, avoiding relegation by defeating Türk Gücü München in a penalty shout out, followed by relegation in its second in 1992–93, in parts caused by financial trouble the club experienced at the time.

Back in the Landesliga, the club struggled for survival in the next three seasons, never able to repeat the 1990–91 performance. At the end of the 1995–96 season, 1. SC came 18th and was relegated back to the Bezirksoberliga. The following season, the club was caught up in a tight race for survival in the Bezirksoberliga. Of the 16 clubs there, the bottom eight were within three points of each other and Bamberg, finishing 13th, was relegated once more when an extra win would have catapulted the club into the top half of the table.

The club's 1997–98 season saw a continuation of the decline, finishing last in the Bezirksliga with only two wins out of 30 games. While 1. SC managed to briefly stabilise itself in the Kreisliga it came close to insolvency at the time, suffering a disastrous 2005–06 season with 28 defeats in 30 games and 209 goals against, and fell as far as the A-Klasse in 2007–08. Since then the club has been fluctuating between the A-Klasse and the Kreisklasse above it.

Honours
The club's honours:

League
 Landesliga Bayern-Nord
 Champions: 1991
 Bezirksoberliga Oberfranken
 Champions: 1990
 A-Klasse Bamberg 2
 Champions: 2014

Recent seasons
The recent season-by-season performance of the club:

With the introduction of the Bezirksoberligas in 1988 as the new fifth tier, below the Landesligas, all leagues below dropped one tier. With the introduction of the Regionalligas in 1994 and the 3. Liga in 2008 as the new third tier, below the 2. Bundesliga, all leagues below dropped one tier. With the establishment of the Regionalliga Bayern as the new fourth tier in Bavaria in 2012 the Bayernliga was split into a northern and a southern division, the number of Landesligas expanded from three to five and the Bezirksoberligas abolished. All leagues from the Bezirksligas onward were elevated one tier.

DFB Cup appearances
The club has qualified for the first round of the German Cup twice:

References

External links
 Official team site  
 Das deutsche Fußball-Archiv  historical German domestic league tables
 Manfreds Fussball Archiv  Tables and results from the Bavarian amateur leagues

Football clubs in Germany
Football clubs in Bavaria
Football in Upper Franconia
Association football clubs established in 1908
1908 establishments in Germany
Bamberg
Sports clubs banned by the Nazis